South Korea competed at the 1984 Summer Paralympics in Stoke Mandeville, Great Britain and New York City, United States. 18 competitors from South Korea won 4 medals, 2 silver and 2 bronze, and finished joint 37th in the medal table with India.

See also 
 South Korea at the Paralympics
 South Korea at the 1984 Summer Olympics

References 

South Korea at the Paralympics
1984 in South Korean sport
Nations at the 1984 Summer Paralympics